Nutrition is a monthly peer-reviewed medical journal covering nutrition science. It was established in 1985 under the name Nutrition International, obtaining its current name in 1987. It is published by Elsevier and the editor-in-chief is Alessandro Laviano (Sapienza University of Rome).

Abstracting and indexing
The journal is abstracted and indexed in:
CINAHL
Current Contents/Life Sciences
MEDLINE
Index Medicus
EMBASE
Food Science and Technology Abstracts
Referativnyi Zhurnal (Russian Academy of Sciences)
SCISEARCH
CAB Abstracts
Scopus
According to the Journal Citation Reports, the journal has a 2016 impact factor of 3.42.

References

External links

Publications established in 1985
Nutrition and dietetics journals
Elsevier academic journals
Monthly journals
English-language journals